The 44th Australian Film Institute Awards (generally known as the AFI Awards) were held in 2002. Presented by the Australian Film Institute (AFI), the awards celebrated the best in Australian feature film, documentary and short film productions of 2002.

All four of the Best Film nominees featured Indigenous subjects.

Winners and nominees
Winners are listed first and highlighted in boldface.

Feature film

Television

Non-feature film

Additional awards

References

External links
 The Australian Film Institute | Australian Academy of Cinema and Television Arts official website

AACTA Awards ceremonies
AACTA Awards
2002 in Australian cinema
December 2002 events in Australia